Robert John Gsellman (born July 18, 1993) is an American professional baseball pitcher for the Yokohama DeNA BayStars of Nippon Professional Baseball (NPB). He has played in Major League Baseball for the New York Mets and Chicago Cubs.

Early life and amateur career
Gsellman is the son of Bob Gsellman, a former minor league catcher drafted by the Philadelphia Phillies in the 23rd round of the 1984 MLB Draft from Culver City High School in California. Gsellman attended Westchester High School in Los Angeles, where he played both basketball and baseball. He was a California Interscholastic Federation state champion in basketball as a junior and voted team captain as a senior. As a junior baseball player, he had a .649 batting average and 1.67 ERA. He was also named to ESPN RISE's Underclassmen All-California team. As a senior, he finished with a .608 batting average with eight home runs and a 1.70 ERA. He verbally committed to Los Angeles Harbor College as a senior.

Professional career

New York Mets
Gsellman was drafted by the New York Mets in the 13th round of the 2011 Major League Baseball draft. He signed with the Mets and made his professional debut with the Gulf Coast Mets. From 2012 to 2015 he played for the Kingsport Mets, Brooklyn Cyclones, Savannah Sand Gnats, St. Lucie Mets and Binghamton Mets. During 2015 with St. Lucie, he was named to the FSL mid-season All Star team, however, did not participate due to his promotion to Binghamton. The Mets added him to their 40-man roster after the season. Also, the team announced that Robert Gsellman was named the Sterling Organizational Pitcher of The Year. For the year Gsellman went 13-7 with a 2.89 ERA in 24 combined starts for St. Lucie and Binghamton. He led the organization with 13 wins and was third in the organization in ERA among qualified pitchers.

Gsellman began the 2016 season with the Las Vegas 51s of the Class AAA Pacific Coast League. The Mets promoted him to the major leagues on August 22 when Steven Matz was placed on the disabled list. Gsellman made his Major League debut on August 23, 2016. Taking over for Jonathan Niese, who had left the game with left knee pain after pitching  of an inning, Gsellman pitched 3 and  innings, racking up 2 strikeouts, giving up no runs, and earning his first Major League win, the second Met rookie to do so in his debut in 2016, after Gabriel Ynoa. Due to an injury to his labrum, Gsellman was unable to swing the bat during his 2016 Major League stint. Nevertheless, on September 25 at Citi Field, Gsellman picked up his first Major League hit on a bunt off of Phillies pitcher Jake Thompson.

Gsellman began the 2017 season as a member of the Mets starting rotation. He was 8-7 with a 5.19 ERA. Batters reached base against him on errors 16 times, tops in the major leagues.

In the 2018 season, Gsellman pitched exclusively out of the bullpen for the Mets. He was 6-3 with a 4.28 ERA and 13 saves. On May 20, he picked up five outs against the Arizona Diamondbacks and recorded the first save of his major league career.

In 2019 for the Mets, Gsellman pitched to a 4.66 ERA in 63.2 innings across 52 appearances before suffering a partially torn right lat in August that would cause him to miss the remainder of the season.

Gsellman opened the pandemic shortened 2020 season on the injured list due to right triceps soreness. On September 8, 2020, Gsellman suffered a fractured rib in an appearance against the Baltimore Orioles, and missed the remainder of the 2020 season. On the year, Gsellman had pitched to a ghastly 9.64 ERA in six appearances, four of them starts, to go along with 9 strikeouts in 14.0 innings pitched.

On June 23, 2021, Gsellman was placed on the 60-day injured list with a right lat strain.

On November 30, Gsellman was non-tendered, making him a free agent.

Chicago Cubs
On March 17, 2022, Gsellman signed a minor league contract with the Chicago Cubs. He was assigned to the Triple-A Iowa Cubs to begin the season, pitching to a 1.17 ERA with 12 strikeouts in 5 appearances. On May 3, Gsellman was selected to the active roster. In 8 appearances with Chicago, he posted a 4.70 ERA and 1.30 WHIP in 15.1 innings pitched. He was designated for assignment on May 30. He cleared waivers and was sent outright to Triple-A Iowa on June 2. He was released on July 13, 2022.

Yokohama DeNA BayStars
On July 28, 2022, Gsellman signed with the Yokohama DeNA BayStars of Nippon Professional Baseball. He re-signed a one-year contract extension for the 2023 season on November 26, 2022.

References

External links

Living people
1993 births
Baseball players from Santa Monica, California
Major League Baseball pitchers
New York Mets players
Chicago Cubs players
Gulf Coast Mets players
Kingsport Mets players
Brooklyn Cyclones players
Savannah Sand Gnats players
St. Lucie Mets players
Binghamton Mets players
Las Vegas 51s players
Binghamton Rumble Ponies players
Westchester High School (Los Angeles) alumni